Germán Arenas y Zuñiga (May 1870 – 10 April 1948) was a Peruvian lawyer and politician. He was a member of the Civilista Party. He was born in Lima, Peru. He graduated from the National University of San Marcos. He served in the Chamber of Deputies of Peru. He was three times minister of the interior (1907–1908, 1917–1918, 1918–1919) and minister of finance (February–April 1918) in the Government of Peru. He was twice Prime Minister of Peru (December 1918 – April 1919, December 1931 – January 1932).

References

Basadre, Jorge: Historia de la República del Perú. 1822 - 1933, Octava Edición, corregida y aumentada. Tomos 10, 11, 12 y 13. Editada por el Diario "La República" de Lima y la Universidad "Ricardo Palma". Impreso en Santiago de Chile, 1998.
Chirinos Soto, Enrique: Historia de la República (1930-1985). Desde Sánchez Cerro hasta Alan García. Tomo II. Lima, AFA Editores Importadores S.A., 1985.
Tauro del Pino, Alberto: Enciclopedia Ilustrada del Perú. Tercera Edición. Tomo 3, ANG/BED. Lima, PEISA, 2001. 

1870 births
1948 deaths
19th-century Peruvian lawyers
National University of San Marcos alumni
Members of the Chamber of Deputies of Peru
People from Lima
Civilista Party politicians
Prime Ministers of Peru
Peruvian Ministers of Economy and Finance
Peruvian Ministers of Interior